The second season of the American television series Black Lightning, which is based on the DC Comics character Jefferson Pierce / Black Lightning, premiered on The CW on October 9, 2018, and ran for 16 episodes until March 18, 2019. The season was produced by Berlanti Productions, Akil Productions, Warner Bros. Television, and DC Entertainment. It was ordered in April 2018 and production began that June, with Salim Akil once again serving as showrunner.

The season continues to follow Jefferson, now a high school teacher who recently re-emerged from retirement as the superhero Black Lightning, as he fights against the local gang and criminal empire called The 100, as well as a corrupt government, in his community of Freeland. Cress Williams stars as Jefferson, along with principal cast members China Anne McClain, Nafessa Williams, Marvin "Krondon" Jones III, Christine Adams, Damon Gupton, and James Remar also returning from the previous season, while Jordan Calloway was promoted to the principal cast from his recurring status in season one.

Episodes

Cast and characters

Main  
 Cress Williams as Jefferson Pierce / Black Lightning
 China Anne McClain as Jennifer Pierce / Lightning
 Nafessa Williams as Anissa Pierce / Thunder
 Christine Adams as Lynn Stewart
 Marvin "Krondon" Jones III as Tobias Whale
 Damon Gupton as Bill Henderson
 Jordan Calloway as Khalil Payne / Painkiller
 James Remar as Peter Gambi

Recurring 

 Robert Townsend as Napier Frank
 Skye P. Marshall as Kara Fowdy
 Clifton Powell as Reverend Jeremiah Holt
 Bill Duke as Agent Percy Odell
 Myles Truitt as Issa Williams
 Chantal Thuy as Grace Choi
 Madison Bailey as Wendy Hernandez
 Erika Alexander as Perenna
 P.J. Byrne as Principal Mike Lowry
 Jennifer Riker as Dr. Helga Jace
 Yolanda T. Ross as Nichelle Payne
 Birgundi Baker as Anaya
 Eric Lynch as Councilman Kwame Parker
 Kearran Giovanni as Giselle Cutter
 RJ Cyler as Todd Green
 Hosea Chanchez as Marcus Bishop / Shakedown
 William Catlett as Latavius "Lala" Johnson / Tattoo Man

Guest 

 Charlbi Dean as Syonide
 Kyanna Simone Simpson as Kiesha
 Angela Rye as herself
 Benjamin L. Crump as himself
 Andy Allo as Zoe B.
 Joshua Mikel as Steven Connors
 Salli Richardson-Whitfield as ADA Montez
 Rob Morean as Deacon
 Jason Louder as Frank "Two-Bits" Tanner
 Sofia Vassilieva as Looker
 Warren "WAWA" Snipe as Thierry
 Charmin Lee as Batina
 Tosin Morohunfola as Instant
 Catherine Dyer as Dr. Ashton Conley
 Dabier Snell as Will
 Michael Wright as Lazarus Prime
 Tracey Bonner as Lawanda White
 Brooke Ence as Rebecca Jones / New Wave
 Derrick Lewis as Darryl Robinson / Coldsnap
 Esteban Cueto as Joe / Heatstroke

Production

Development 
On April 2, 2018, The CW renewed the series for its second season. On the renewal of Black Lightning as well as other series, network president Mark Pedowitz released a statement reading, "As The CW expands to a six-night, Sunday-through-Friday schedule next season, we are proud to have such a deep bench of great returning series for 2018-19. By picking these 10 series up for next season, we have a terrific selection of programming to choose from when we set our fall schedule in May, with more still to come. And I'm especially happy that we'll continue to work with the incredibly talented casts, producers and writers who create the series our fans are so passionate about." Executive producer and series developer Salim Akil returned to serve as the season's showrunner. On January 31, 2019, The CW renewed the series for a third season shortly after production on the second season had wrapped.

Writing 
In keeping with the "less procedural and more serialized" nature of the series compared to The CW's other superhero offerings, the second season features many of the same villains that were present in the first season, including Tobias Whale, Syonide, and Khalil Payne / Painkiller. Showrunner Salim Akil commented, "I don't want to introduce too many villains. I want us to settle in now that we know everyone. We know what the A.S.A. is, we know who Tobias is, so now we can really tell some grounded stories about our villains, our heroes, the people in Freeland." While Tobias and Syonide continue to act as straight-up villains, Khalil presents "a much more compelling emotional storyline as Jennifer [searches] for a way to redeem the love of her life." Akil said that there would additionally be "other forces in Freeland and outside of Freeland" that would come into play as sources of conflict. Cress Williams described the season as "harder hitting and a little bit darker" than the series' debut outing, but indicated that the second season would build upon the foundation of the first.

Akil revealed that the season would be organized into smaller arcs known as "books" to mimic the style of the comic book source material, and that "consequences" would be the theme of the season's first book. Specifically, he said that the season would "deal with the consequences of having discovered the pod children; the consequences of Green Light hitting the streets; and the consequences of Jefferson's daughters discovering they have powers." On the decision to begin the season by examining the consequences of the first season, Akil explained, "I didn't want to just stop and then start some whole new story. I wanted to see what the consequences were for the city of Freeland, as well as for the family. What are the effects of Green Light in the community? What does that do? It's giving people an excuse to shoot first and ask questions later." Furthering the season's objective to "give a nod to comic books in a stronger way," Akil also said that the season would feature more metahumans.

On the relevant social issues that the season would address and on how the consequences of the first season would play out for the Pierce family personally, Akil stated, "I wanted to talk about black people and therapy. We don't believe in that shit, but we're the number one people who need it." China Anne McClain praised the decision to give her character a therapist as a way of controlling her powers, noting that in season one, "Jennifer had so many psychological issues with getting these powers. She did not want them. She already felt like an outsider being a part of this amazing family, and living on the house on top of the hill, and so adding super powers on top of it just made things worse for her." Conversely, Nafessa Williams shared that her character would continue to embrace her powers through her work as a superhero, elaborating that Anissa now "feels confident navigating the superhero world without her father, and she feels fully confident and able to do it on her own." Regarding the Pierce siblings opposing reactions to gaining superpowers, McClain said, "It's gonna bring them together in certain ways and then push them apart in others. You're gonna see a lot of different ups and downs in their relationship this season."

Casting 
Main cast members Cress Williams, China Anne McClain, Nafessa Williams, Christine Adams, Marvin "Krondon" Jones III, Damon Gupton, and James Remar return from the previous season as Jefferson Pierce / Black Lightning, Jennifer Pierce, Anissa Pierce / Thunder, Lynn Stewart, Tobias Whale, Bill Henderson, and Peter Gambi, respectively. On July 21, 2018, at San Diego Comic Con, it was announced that Jordan Calloway had been promoted to a series regular for the second season after previously recurring during the first season as Khalil Payne / Painkiller.

On August 8, 2018, it was reported that Myles Truitt would play Issa Williams during the season in a recurring capacity. On September 5, Sofia Vassilieva was announced in the role of Looker, based on the DC Comics character of the same name. On September 21, it was reported that Kearran Giovanni would recur as Cutter, a British mercenary. On October 4, it was revealed that Erika Alexander had booked a three-episode recurring role as Jennifer's telepathic therapist, Perenna, though she ultimately appeared in a total of eight episodes. Robert Townsend and Bill Duke were added as recurring characters Dr. Napier Frank and Agent Percy Odell, respectively, on October 9. On November 13, RJ Cyler was cast in the recurring role of "gangly and awkward tech genius" Todd Green. On January 21, 2019, it was announced that Hosea Chanchez had been cast to recur as Marcus Bishop / Shakedown.

Design 
This season introduces the first official superhero costume for Jennifer Pierce as she takes on the moniker "Lightning" from the comic book source material. The costume echoes that of Anissa Pierce, Jennifer's older sister who operates as the superhero Thunder, in that it is a black body suit covered in yellow plating. However, the Lightning costume also features lightning-inspired designs.

Filming 
Production for the season began on June 26, 2018, in Atlanta, Georgia. The back lot used during filming was the same one used by The CW's previous Atlanta-based television series, The Vampire Diaries. Salli Richardson-Whitfield directed and guest-starred in the fourth episode of the season, while recurring cast member Robert Townsend directed the thirteenth episode of the season. Black Lightning creator Tony Isabella attended the season wrap party with the cast and crew on January 5, 2019, and visited the set during the final week of production. Filming for the second season concluded on January 10, 2019.

Music 
Composer Kurt Farquhar returned to score the second season. Salim Akil's son, the rapper Godholly, additionally provided new original music for the season. Tracks by Godholly from the season include "T Whale" and "Survival Mode" from the eighth episode, "In the Streets Again" and "How I Feel" from the ninth episode, and "100 Gang" from the thirteenth episode.

Release

Broadcast 
In May 2018, it was announced that Black Lightning, which served as a mid-season entry for its first season, would instead debut in the fall of the 2018–19 television season for its second. The second season premiered on The CW in the United States on October 9, 2018. In November, it was announced that the series would move to airing on Mondays at 9:00pm following Arrow for the second half of the season after previously airing on Tuesdays at 9:00pm following The Flash since its debut. The 16th and final episode of the season aired on March 18, 2019.

Home media 
Having acquired the international distribution and streaming rights for Black Lightning, Netflix aired new episodes of the season weekly in regions outside of the United States, including Canada, Australia, New Zealand, the United Kingdom, Ireland, most of mainland Europe, and South America. The season was released in its entirety on Netflix in the United States on April 1, 2019, two weeks after the finale aired on The CW.

The complete second season of Black Lightning was made available as a manufacture-on-demand DVD through the Warner Archive Collection on October 8, 2019.

Marketing 
The main cast of the season as well as executive producers Salim Akil and Mara Brock Akil attended San Diego Comic-Con on July 21, 2018, to promote the season. The first trailer of the season was released on September 6. On December 13, The CW released the first promotional image of China Anne McClain as Jennifer Pierce in her official Lightning superhero costume.

Reception

Ratings

Critical response 
The second season of Black Lightning received generally positive reviews from professional critics. On the review aggregation website Rotten Tomatoes, the season holds a 91% approval rating, with an average rating of 7.41/10, based on 10 reviews. The website's critic consensus reads: "Faced with the responsibility of aiding Freeland through trying times, the Pierce family takes Black Lightning back by storm."

Writing for The A.V. Club, Kyle Fowle gave the premiere episode an "A−" grade, noting, "One of the reasons the first season was so compelling was that the show made the political personal. That's once again evident here, as there's a wonderful sense of the larger community throughout the premiere." Kayti Burt of Den of Geek! gave the premiere a rating of 3.5 stars out of 5, explaining, "There's a lack of thematic cohesiveness in this season premiere that is probably a result of trying to reintroduce so many characters and storylines at once, but the energy and potential for a strong second season is definitely there. Black Lightning continues to be one of the best, most important shows on television." IGNs Carl Waldron wrote, "Black Lightning himself doesn't see much action in the Season 2 premiere, but the rest of the cast picks up the slack." He gave the episode a rating of 7.5 out of 10 and said that, "Black Lightning continues to be an engaging character-led series." Recapping the premiere for Entertainment Weekly, Christian Holub gave the episode a "B" grade.

In her review for Collider, Allison Keene gave the season's early storylines 4 stars out of 5, writing, "Black Lightning is not without its own flaws, including occasionally disjointed or abrupt storytelling, but its clear desire to educate and inspire through compelling family drama continues to make it a show of consequence." Burt and Syfy Wire contributor Stephanie Williams praised the season for its efforts to de-stigmatize mental health care, especially for black women. Burt called Jennifer's therapy storyline "a powerful, vital representation of mental health issues—not only within the superhero genre, but anywhere on TV." Editorializing for Rotten Tomatoes, Erik Amaya criticized the season's questionable and "imprecise" timeline, as well as Grace Choi's "dispersed" appearances. In regards to the latter critique, Amaya said, "Hopefully, the third season will focus more time on her secret and offer her the opportunity to become more than an occasional guest character." He concluded, "Black Lightning introduced a lot of interesting ideas – even if they are not always served well – and we can't wait to see what becomes of them next year."

Again reviewing for The A.V. Club, Fowle gave the season finale a "C+" grade. He named Jennifer's journey as "undoubtedly" the best part of the season, but felt that the second season as a whole "struggled to reach the heights of its first season" and that "storylines were introduced with full force before petering out, [...] stumbling towards lackluster conclusions." Also reviewing for the finale episode, Burt of Den of Geek! gave the episode a rating of 3 out of 5 stars. She praised Jennifer's character development and Cress Williams' performance, but criticized the season's "tangents" and "unfocused" nature. Dan Ashby of Cultured Vultures gave the whole season a rating of 7.5 out of 10, writing, "Season two of Black Lightning has some interesting storylines, a number of good fight scenes, a catchy soundtrack, and some important messages. Unfortunately, it all seems slightly uncoordinated and messy in its execution." In a more positive account from Entertainment Weekly, Christian Holub gave the season finale a "B" grade, adding, "Season 2's penultimate installment was all over the place, but tonight's season finale did a good job of bringing enough of the threads together that I'm now satisfied to wait for season 3."

Awards and nominations

References

External links 

 

2018 American television seasons
2019 American television seasons
Black Lightning (TV series) seasons